The 1959 European Amateur Team Championship took place 22–27 June on the Real Club de Golf El Prat outside Barcelona, Spain. It was the first men's golf European Amateur Team Championship.

Format 
All participating teams played two qualification rounds of stroke-play, counting the four best scores out of up to six players for each team. The four best teams formed flight A. The next four best teams formed flight B.

The winner in each flight was determined by a round-robin system. All teams in the flight met each other and the team with most points for team matches in flight A won the tournament, using the scale, win=2 points, halved=1 point, lose=0 points. In each match between two nation teams, three foursome games and six single games were played.

Teams 
Nine nation teams contested the event. Each team consisted of a minimum of six players.

Players in the leading teams

* Note: Odqvist entered the tournament as non-playing captain, but since Lindeblad and Möller was not able to play on June 25th in Sweden's match against Spain and Bielke and Carlander was not able to play on June 26th in Sweden's match against West Germany, due to food poisoning, Odqist played in these two matches.

Other participating teams

Winners 
Team Sweden won the championship, earning 5 points in flight A. Team France finished second, ahead of host country Spain.

Individual winner in the opening 36-hole stroke-play qualifying competition was Dietrich von Knoop, West Germany, with a score of 2-over-par 146. Henri de Lamaze, France, shot a new course record in the second round, with a score of 69 over 18 holes at the El Prat course.

Results
Qualification rounds

Team standings

Individual leader

 Note: There was no official recognition for the lowest individual score.

Flight A

Team matches

Team standings

Flight B

Team matches

Team standings

Final standings

Sources:

See also
Eisenhower Trophy – biennial world amateur team golf championship for men organized by the International Golf Federation.
European Ladies' Team Championship – European amateur team golf championship for women organised by the European Golf Association.

References

External links
European Golf Association: Full results

European Amateur Team Championship
Golf tournaments in Spain
European Amateur Team Championship
European Amateur Team Championship
European Amateur Team Championship